The Piganino is a conjectural musical instrument using a keyboard as to produce sound from pigs by poking them.

Background 
Louis XI of France was said to have challenged Abbé de Baigne to develop such an instrument, believing that it was impossible to do so. The Abbé, a well known constructor, anecdotally accepted the order against payment. The instrument was a variant of an organ using a keyboard to pick the pigs, which were sorted sizewise.

This may be compared to the "domestication" of sound in sampling, sequencing, and synthesis.

Striped pigs in the US 

The American quickstep song La Piganino mocked Italian influences on amateur music and popular culture in the 19th-century US. Beside lack of taste and vocal variety, the tendency to Italianize the names of all things chic and musical was lampooned. The cartoon anticipates the surrealistic machinery of Rube Goldberg. The 19th century played on various allegations, besides Piganino, further nicknames used for the fictitious instrument were "Hog Harmonium", "Swineway" or "Porko Forte".

The background was a commons-related conflict: poor farmers tended to let their pigs roam freely, feeding on what the rich did not use, whereas the rich preferred towns and property to be tidily divided.  The striped pig was used to represent such untidiness in general and drinking men specifically. Piganino and related cartoons insofar referred to uppity and wannabee neighbors and their porcine conflicts with others.  In parallel, the Schweinfurter Anzeiger as of 1873 had renewed interest on the French historical origin of the Schweineorgel.

Le Libertin 
In the film Le Libertin (2000), the philosopher Denis Diderot is depicted as a screwball eccentric, trying to have his forbidden Encyclopédie printed under the eyes of Catholic fanatics. The film is staged in the chateau of a crazy Baron, loosely based on the Baron d'Holbach. In reality, the Baron d'Holbach was a devoted atheist and important sponsor and contributor to the Encyclopédie. The film shows him as an adversary of Diderot and inventor of a large variety of funny machinery. The noise of a Piganino, one of the inventions, is being used to hide the printing of the forbidden encyclopaedia in the film.

Further use 
In German, Schweineorgel has also been used as a nickname for the accordion or harmonium, as those instruments were deemed rural and not appropriate for music on academic level. Athanasius Kircher's Katzenklavier uses a similar concept with cats. This sort of caricature was often used when new music styles came around or were adopted in musical realms that had not dealt with them previously. The cat organ, a similar instrument using cats, is used in stories which criticize the cruelty of royalty.

Monty Python's "Musical Mice" uses mice instead.

References

Further reading 
Quignard, Pascal (2016). "Sixth Treatise: Louis XI and the Musical Pigs", The Hatred of Music. Yale University. .

Fictional musical instruments
Keyboard instruments
Pet equipment
Zoomusicology